Virgin Unite is the working name of The Virgin Foundation, the independent charitable arm of the Virgin Group.  Created by Richard Branson and Virgin employees in September 2004, Virgin Unite pools volunteering efforts from across the Virgin Group and its hundreds of subsidiaries and associated companies to grow the efforts of smaller grassroots charitable organizations. Partnered with more than a dozen charities worldwide the company also provides a resource through the Internet by serving as an online donation centre for those wanting to contribute.

The primary aims of the foundation are to make sustainable change through economic development towards tough social and environmental issues. These include addressing the issue of delivering healthcare to rural parts of Africa.  Branson and Virgin underwrite all the operating costs of the organization, so 100% of contributions can be applied towards causes.

History

Parent charitable organizations – 1987
AIDS was first recognized on June 5, 1981.  In 1986, it was reported that three to five million Americans would be HIV positive and one million would be dead of AIDS by 1996.  In response to such reports, Virgin incorporated a charitable group called The Healthcare Foundation on August 3, 1987 to provide research in and education about AIDS.  In July 1988, the foundation's charitable objectives expanded to include the relief of poverty and the relief of disabled persons from their disabilities.

Virgin Unite – 2004
In 2003, the foundation sought to determine what others thought it should focus on.  After spending six months speaking with social issues groups, Virgin Group suppliers and partners, and numerous Virgin staff members in South Africa, Australia, the United States and the United Kingdom, the organization concluded that many people and companies were deterred from participating in philanthropic activities by the complexities of the charity sector.  The foundation sought then to use the Virgin Group's corporate and organizational experience to identify the best practices in this sector and to facilitate the entry of new participants.

Between 1987 and 2004, Virgin Unite operated first as The Healthcare Foundation and then The Virgin Healthcare Foundation.  In mid-September 2004, Virgin established the subsidiary The Virgin Foundation doing business as Virgin Unite in the United Kingdom to coordinate all Virgin's worldwide charitable ventures.  Citing the spread of HIV in Africa and the twin problems of malaria and malnutrition as the first priority issues, Branson explained his reasoning behind Virgin Unite:
I've reached the age [54] where I've made a lot of money, the companies are going really well and we've got a lot of talented people working for us. Now we are going to turn our business skills into tackling issues around the world where we can help. ... In the next 30 years or so I can make an enormous difference to a lot of people's lives just by using the strength of my own brand name and being able to pick up the phone and get through to the President of Nigeria or Thabo Mbeki. We have the financial resources and the business know-how. If the Virgin foundation works as I hope it will, it could be that Virgin becomes better known for that than for the businesses we are in.

Branding
Virgin Unite has created a branding scheme based around the idea of redemption to encourage Virgin company employees to donate their time, rather than their money, to one of twelve partner charities.

Since 2007, Virgin Unite has held the Rock the Kasbah gala in Los Angeles each year to raise funds for their programs.  Rock the Kasbah is their only US fundraising event.

Joe Polish, who helped raise over $3 million for Virgin Unite, was the inaugural winner of Sir Richard and Virgin Unite's One in a Million Award, which Polish received at the 2009 Rock the Kasbash Gala. In 2010, Virgin Unite recognised Polish as their first “Entrepreneur of the Quarter”.

See also
 Amnesty International
 Crisis
 Oxfam
 Global health
 Natalie Imbruglia

Notes and references

External links
 
 Virgin Unite Launches With Innovative Mobile Auction  PrimeZone  (20 September 2006)  Accessed 28 December 2006.
"Branson’s approach to charity is the same", Forbes, 6 December 2006: accessed 28 December 2006.
"Virgin UK Exports Another Peculiar Corporate Charity", wheremostneeded.org, 20 September 2006: accessed 28 December 2006.
Charity Summary: The Virgin Foundation, GuideStar: accessed 28 December 2006.

•  Top Virgin killer sweater
Charities based in London
U
1987 establishments in the United Kingdom